Churuk-e Olya (also Romanized as Chūrūk-e ‘Olyā; also known as Chorak, Churak, Chūrūk-e Bālā, and Chūzak-e ‘Olyā) is a village in Chaypareh-ye Bala Rural District, Zanjanrud District, Zanjan County, Zanjan Province, Iran. At the 2006 census, its population was 293, in 63 families.

References 

Populated places in Zanjan County